Gunindra Nath Das is an Asom Gana Parishad politician from Assam. He has been elected in Assam Legislative Assembly election in 2006 and 2016 from Barpeta constituency.

References 

Living people
Asom Gana Parishad politicians
Assam MLAs 2006–2011
People from Barpeta
Year of birth missing (living people)